António Dias Cardoso (1933 – 24 June 2006) served as the President of the Democratic Movement of Angola until he joined the MPLA in 1975.

Cardoso was born in Luanda. He was arrested in 1961 by the Portuguese Secret Police and exiled to Cape Verde.
He died of prostate cancer in Portugal. He worked as the editor of Progresso newspaper of the MPLA after independence. He is the author of many books and poetry, including Poemas de Circunstancia (1961), Panfleto (1979), Poemas da Cadeia (1979), and Economia Politica (1979).

External links
Article concerning his death
Article with small biography and death announcement

1933 births
2006 deaths
Angolan writers
Angolan Marxists
Deaths from cancer in Portugal
People from Luanda
Deaths from prostate cancer
MPLA politicians